U.S. Route 34 (US 34) is an east–west highway In the state of Illinois that runs from the Iowa state line at Gulfport, west of Galesburg, to Illinois Route 43 (IL 43) and Historic U.S. Route 66 at Harlem Avenue in Berwyn. The entire highway in Illinois is named the Walter Payton Memorial Highway after Pro Football Hall of Famer Walter Payton, who wore #34 for the Chicago Bears.

The bridge into Iowa over the Mississippi River is called the Great River Bridge. Between Monmouth and Galesburg, the highway is up to Interstate Highway standards with exits at Main Street, Henderson Street, and Seminary Street in Galesburg.

Route description

Iowa state line to Monmouth

After leaving Iowa via the Great River Bridge, US 34 enters Gulfport. In Gulfport, US 34 meets a local road at a parclo. It then travels further east, then turns into a 2-lane undivided highway, then turns northeast, and then back east again. It then meets IL 164 south of Gladstone. Just west of Biggsville, US 34 turns into a 4-lane divided bypass. After that, US 34 meets IL 94 and IL 116. East of Biggsville, it soon reverts to a 2-lane highway again. At Kirkwood, it turns north and then east again. At a 5-ramp parclo, US 34 turns north onto a 4-lane divided expressway (signed as US 67/IL 110 (CKC)). Just west of Monmouth, IL 164 runs concurrently with the other two routes. After they curve east, US 67 branches off north from the other three routes. Just northeast of Monmouth, IL 164 branches off northeast. The other two routes then become a freeway.

Monmouth to Kewanee
In the middle of Coldbrook and Cameron, the two routes meet a local road at a diamond interchange. Northeast of the Galesburg Municipal Airport, they then meet IL 164 (once again) and IL 41 at another diamond interchange where both IL 164 and IL 41 end. They then meet US 150 at a cloverleaf interchange and then another local road at a diamond interchange. At another cloverleaf interchange, IL 110 diverges north via I-74 while US 34 moves eastward (soon northeastward). At that point, the freeway ends and becomes a 2-lane road. North of Wataga, IL 167 intersects and ends at US 34. It continues northeasterly until it reaches Altona. At that point, it travels due north and then curves east. At that curve, it then runs concurrently with IL 17. IL 17 then diverges southward in Galva. US 34 then turns northeast, begins to run concurrently with IL 78, turn north, and intersect IL 91 before reaching Kewanee.

Kewanee to Berwyn
At 2nd Street in Kewanee, US 34 turns east from IL 78. Then, it turns north before reaching a railroad. At that point, it turns northeast which follows the railroad. Northeast of Neponset, it turns northward. Between Sheffield and Princeton, US 34 runs concurrently with US 6. In Princeton, it then follows IL 26 before it reaches Elm Place where US 34 branches off east (soon northeast). It then crosses under I-80, intersects IL 89, and then IL 92 in LaMoille. At the junction where US 34 intersect IL 92, it turns east. Further east, it intersects US 52/IL 251 in Mendota, then turns north, northeast, then turns back east, and then meets I-39/US 51 east of Mendota. The route continues east, swinging north and east twice before running along the southern border of Earlville and meeting IL 23 South of Leland. IL 23 runs concurrently with US 34 for about 4 miles. Then, between Leland and Somonauk, IL 23 branches off northward. Continuing east, it intersects IL 47 in Yorkville, IL 31, IL 25, and IL 71 in Oswego. Furthermore, it briefly runs concurrently with US 30 southeast of Aurora, intersects IL 59 at the city limit of Naperville, and meets IL 53 in Lisle at a 4-ramp parclo. Near the Illinois Tollway headquarters, it meets I-355, as well as I-88, at a mix of interchanges. Further east, it meets IL 83 at another 4-ramp parclo, I-294 at a cloverleaf interchange, intersects US 12/US 20/US 45 north of La Grange, and then IL 171 in Lyons before US 34 ends at IL 43 at Berwyn. At that point, the road continues on as Ogden Avenue and Historic US 66 all the way to Chicago.

History
Up until 1935, Illinois Route 28 roughly followed US 34 from Galesburg to Sheffield. Also, a part of IL 8 followed part of US 34 from Burlington to Galesburg. In 1935, US 34 absorbed what had been the last remaining section of US 32 as well as IL 18, IL 28, and a portion of IL 8.

US 34 formerly overlapped US 66 all the way to its endpoint in downtown Chicago, but was truncated to its intersection with US 66 and IL 43 in Berwyn in 1970. When US 66 was subsequently eliminated, the endpoint of US 34 was left at that location—the intersection of Ogden and Harlem Avenues in Berwyn. Due to the elimination of US 66, it is one of the few U.S. Highways that ends at a state highway. With the re-signing of much of Historic US 66, the history of US 34's eastern endpoint is becoming much more clear.

Major intersections

References

 

34
 Illinois
Transportation in Henderson County, Illinois
Transportation in Warren County, Illinois
Transportation in Knox County, Illinois
Transportation in Henry County, Illinois
Transportation in Bureau County, Illinois
Transportation in LaSalle County, Illinois
Transportation in Kendall County, Illinois
Transportation in Kane County, Illinois
Transportation in DuPage County, Illinois
Transportation in Cook County, Illinois